The Lipotrophidae are a family of parasitic alveolates in the phylum Apicomplexa. Species in this family infect insects (Diptera, Lepidoptera, Coleoptera and Hymenoptera).

History

This family was created by Grasse in 1953.

Taxonomy

Six genera are currently recognised in this family.

Lifecycle

Merogony generally occurs by budding from surface of meront to form uniformly sized merozoites. The gametes are similar (isogametes) and fuse to form navicular oocysts which have pronounced polar thickenings. The oocysts contain eight (rarely four) sporozoites.

References

Apicomplexa families
Parasites of insects